In the Catholic Church, the anointing of the sick, also known as Extreme Unction, is a Catholic sacrament that is administered to a Catholic "who, having reached the age of reason, begins to be in danger due to sickness or old age", except in the case of those who "persevere obstinately in manifest grave sin". Proximate danger of death, the occasion for the administration of Viaticum, is not required, but only the onset of a medical condition of serious illness or injury or simply old age: "It is not a sacrament for those only who are at the point of death. Hence, as soon as anyone of the faithful begins to be in danger of death from sickness or old age, the fitting time for him to receive this sacrament has certainly already arrived."

Despite that position, anointing of the sick has in practice often been postponed until someone is near dying, in spite of the fact that in all celebrations of this sacrament, the liturgy prays for recovery of the health of the sick person if that would be conducive to his salvation. In the past it became increasingly administered only to the dying and so came to be called Extreme Unction (Final Anointing).

The sacrament is administered by a bishop or priest, who uses the oleum infirmorum ('oil of the sick'), an olive oil or another pure plant oil blessed by a bishop, to anoint the patient's forehead and perhaps other parts of the body while reciting certain prayers. It gives comfort, peace, courage and, if the sick person is unable to make a confession, even forgiveness of sins.

Introduction

Sacramental graces
The Catholic Church sees the effects of the sacrament as follows: As the sacrament of Marriage gives grace for the married state, the sacrament of Anointing of the Sick gives grace for the state into which people enter through sickness. Through the sacrament a gift of the Holy Spirit is given, that renews confidence and faith in God and strengthens against temptations to discouragement, despair and anguish at the thought of death and the struggle of death; it prevents the believer from losing Christian hope in God's justice, truth and salvation. Because one of the effects of the sacrament is to absolve the recipient of any sins not previously absolved through the sacrament of penance, only an ordained priest or bishop may administer the sacrament.

"The special grace of the sacrament of the Anointing of the Sick has as its effects:
the uniting of the sick person to the passion of Christ, for his own good and that of the whole Church;
the strengthening, peace, and courage to endure in a Christian manner the sufferings of illness or old age;
the forgiveness of sins, if the sick person was not able to obtain it through the sacrament of penance;
the restoration of health, if it is conducive to the salvation of his soul;
the preparation for passing over to eternal life."

An extensive account of the teaching of the Catholic Church on Anointing of the Sick is given in Catechism of the Catholic Church, 1499–1532.

Biblical references
The chief Biblical text concerning anointing of the sick is : "Is any man sick among you? Let him bring in the priests of the church and let them pray over him, anointing him with oil in the name of the Lord. And the prayer of faith shall save the sick man. And the Lord shall raise him up: and if he be in sins, they shall be forgiven him."

Names for the sacrament
In the past, the usual name of the sacrament in official documents of the Catholic Church was Extreme Unction (meaning final anointing), a name attached to it as it was administered only to those near death. Peter Lombard (died 1160) is the first writer known to have used the term, which did not become the usual name in the West until towards the end of the twelfth century, and never became current in the East. The word "extreme" (final) indicated either that it was the last of the sacramental unctions (after the anointings at Baptism, Confirmation and, if received, Holy Orders) or because at that time it was normally administered only when a patient was in extremis (near death). In the early 1970s the official name was changed to Anointing of the Sick to reflect Church teaching that the sacrament is to be conferred on those who are "dangerously ill".

The sacrament has also been known by various other names in Western Christianity throughout the years, including: the holy oil or unction of the sick; the unction or blessing of consecrated oil; the unction of God; the office of the unction. In the Eastern Church it is technically known as euchelaion (i.e., prayer-oil); other names used include: elaion hagion (holy oil), hegismenon elaion (consecrated oil), elaiou chrisis (anointing with oil), chrisma (anointing).

Administration

Catholic canon law indicates who may receive the sacrament: "The anointing of the sick can be administered to a member of the faithful who, having reached the use of reason, begins to be in danger due to sickness or old age." If a new illness develops or the first illness relapses or worsens, the patient may receive the sacrament a further time. A priest may, on the basis of his pastoral judgment, administer the sacrament numerous times in cases of old age or chronic illness. Like any sacrament, anointing of the sick can be given only to someone who is alive; however, as the precise moment of death is not known or defined with precision, someone may be anointed conditionally ("if you are alive" prefixed to the sacramental formula) during a brief period after being declared clinically dead.

The sacrament of anointing can be administered to an individual whether at home, in a hospital or institution, or in church. Several sick persons may be anointed within the rite, especially if the celebration takes place in a church or hospital. The celebration may also take place during a Catholic Mass.

Relationship with the "last rites"
When administered to those near to death, the sacraments of Penance, Anointing of the Sick and Viaticum (Holy Communion administered to someone who is dying) are sometimes called the last rites.

What in the judgment of the Catholic Church are properly described as the last rites are Viaticum, and the ritual prayers of Commendation of the Dying, and Prayers for the Dead.

The normal order of administration of these three sacraments to the dying is: first Reconciliation (if the dying person is physically unable to confess, absolution is given conditionally on the existence of contrition), then Anointing, then Viaticum.

Only a priest or bishop can administer the sacraments of Reconciliation and Anointing of the Sick, but a lay person may give a dying person Holy Communion as "Viaticum, the Last Sacrament of the Christian".

Established form
The oil used in the sacrament is usually olive oil, though other oils may also be used. It is blessed by the bishop of the diocese at the Chrism Mass he celebrates on Holy Thursday or on a day close to it. In case of necessity, the priest administering the sacrament may bless the oil within the framework of the celebration.

In the Roman Rite of the Latin Church, the priest anoints the sick person's forehead and hands with oil (usually in the form of a cross), saying: "Through this holy anointing, may the Lord in his love and mercy help you with the grace of the Holy Spirit. May the Lord who frees you from sin save you and raise you up." He may also, in accordance with local culture and traditions, and the needs of the sick person, anoint other parts of the body, but without repeating the sacramental formula.

This is the form established for the Roman Rite through the papal document Sacram unctionem infirmorum of 1972. The form used in the Roman Rite in the preceding period included anointing of seven parts of the body (though that of the loins was generally omitted in English-speaking countries), while saying (in Latin): "Through this holy anointing, may the Lord pardon you whatever sins/faults you have committed by... ." The sense in question was then mentioned: sight, hearing, smell, taste, touch, walking, carnal delectation.

Eastern Catholic churches
In the Eastern Catholic churches, the sacrament (or "sacred mystery") of Anointing the Sick is administered using various liturgies often identical with forms used by non-Catholic Eastern churches. Adaptation or development of the liturgical forms used in the Eastern Catholic churches is overseen by the Congregation for the Oriental Churches, part of the Roman Curia.

See also

 Indulgence
 Simony
 Votive Mass

References

Bibliography 

 

Sacraments of the Catholic Church
 

zh:病人傅油聖事